"Bounce" is a song by American rock band Bon Jovi. It was released as the third single from the band's 2002 album of the same name to US rock radio only, peaking at number 39 on the Billboard Hot Mainstream Rock Tracks chart in 2003.

Overview
The song is dedicated to Bill Belichick, the head coach of the New England Patriots, a National Football League team. It was also released as a double A-side with "Misunderstood" in Japan.

Track listing
Japanese CD single
 "Bounce"
 "Misunderstood" (single mix)
 "Everyday" (acoustic)
 "Undivided" (demo version)

Charts

References

External links
 Bon Jovi's Official Website

Bon Jovi songs
2003 singles
2003 songs
Island Records singles
Songs written by Billy Falcon
Songs written by Jon Bon Jovi
Songs written by Richie Sambora